Miguel Ernesto Littin Cucumides (born 9 August 1942) is a Chilean film director, screenwriter, film producer and novelist. He was born to a Palestinian father, Hernán Littin and a Greek mother, Cristina Cucumides.

Career 

Miguel Littin directed El Chacal de Nahueltoro (1969) becoming a figure of the New Latin American Cinema.

Littin was exiled in México shortly after Augusto Pinochet came to power in a military coup, which ousted President Salvador Allende, on September 11, 1973. His 1973 film The Promised Land was entered into the Cannes Film Festival, New York film festival and the 8th Moscow International Film Festival.

In México he directed several films:

 Letters from Marusia, based on a miners strike in Chile. Letters from Marusia was nominated for the Academy Award for Best Foreign Language Film.
 El Recurso del Método (Long Live the President) based on Alejo Carpentier's novel El Recurso del método (Reasons of State); a co-production with Mexico, France and Cuba. 
 The Widow of Montiel, with Geraldine Chaplin, based on a Gabriel García Márquez short story.

Then he went to Nicaragua to make Alsino and the Condor, based on the novel Alsino by Pedro Prado. In 1981 he was a member of the jury at the 12th Moscow International Film Festival.

After moving to Spain in 1984, Littin decided to enter Chile clandestinely to make a documentary that showed the condition of the country under the Pinochet regime. It was made the subject of Nobel Laureate Gabriel Garcia Marquez's book Clandestine in Chile: The Adventures of Miguel Littin. This book chronicles his incognito escapades in Chile as he exposes the regime.

He eventually returned to Chile where he continued to make films, among them Tierra del Fuego, based on the adventures of explorer Julius Popper; and Dawson, Isla 10, about a group of political prisoners sent to Dawson's Island during Pinochet's regime. Littin was the mayor of his home town in the center valley, Palmilla in 1992-94 and re-elected for the period 1996–2000.

His films Actas de Marusia and Alsino and the Condor were nominated by the Academy of Motion Picture Arts and Sciences for Best Film in a Foreign Language. Alsino and the Condor won the Golden Prize at the 13th Moscow International Film Festival.

His 2005 film The Last Moon was entered into the 27th Moscow International Film Festival.

Filmography

References

External links

1942 births
Ariel Award winners
Best Director Ariel Award winners
Living people
People from Colchagua Province
Chilean people of Palestinian descent
Chilean film directors
Chilean screenwriters
Male screenwriters
Chilean people of Greek descent
Instituto Regional Federico Errázuriz alumni
University of Chile alumni
Mayors of places in Chile